Rose Hip, rosehip, or variation, may refer to:

 Rose hips, the fruit of the rose flower plant
 Rosehip neuron, a type of GABA neuron
 The Rosehips (album), an album by Kevin Junior
 Rose Hip (manga franchise), a Japanese comic book franchise created by Tooru Fujisawa
 Rose Hip Rose, a manga created by Tooru Fujisawa
 Rose Hip Zero, a manga created by Tooru Fujisawa

See also

 Rosehip extract
 Rose hip soup
 Rose hip wine
 
 
 Rose (disambiguation)
 Hip (disambiguation)